Rossby is an impact crater in the Eridania quadrangle on Mars at 47.5°S and 167.9°E, and it is 80 kilometers in diameter.  Its name was approved in 1973, and refers to Swedish-American meteorologist Carl-Gustaf Rossby.  Pictures show gullies on the wall of Rossby Crater.

See also 
 List of craters on Mars

References 

Impact craters on Mars
Eridania quadrangle